Joanna Senyszyn (born 1 February 1949) is a Polish politician and professor of Economics.

Senyszyn is member of the left-wing party Democratic Left Alliance (SLD), in which she was vice-president (2005–2008). From 2001 to 2009 she was a member of the Sejm until she was elected as a member of the European Parliament (2009–2014). Since 2019 she is again a member of the Sejm. She is known as a critic of Catholicism.

Educational career 
Joanna Senyszyn holds the academic rank of Professor ordinarius and holds the chair in market research at the University of Gdańsk, where she also served as the Dean of the Faculty of Business Administration before being elected to the Sejm.

Political career 
From 1975 and until 1990 when it was disbanded as a result of fall of communism in Poland , Senyszyn was a member of the Polish United Workers' Party (PZPR), the governing party in the People's Republic of Poland. However, in 1980 she joined the Solidarność opposition movement, of which she continued to be a member until 1995.

Later, she joined SLD and was a successful candidate in the 2001 parliamentary election from the Democratic Left Alliance-Labor Union (SLD-UP) list, becoming a member of the Sejm. She was also a candidate in the European Parliament election in 2004, but did not win a seat. In 2005, she won another Sejm term in the election (getting 11925 votes in district 26 Gdynia) and became a vice-president of her party. From 2009 to 2014 she was a member of the European Parliament.

Media
Senyszyn's public appearances, both in the Sejm and on other occasions, are often marked by the use of provocative language and satire. She is credited with coining the term kaczyzm to describe her political opponents of the Law and Justice government. 

She raised some controversy (and gained media attention) when she paraphrased the words of Pope John Paul II during the Parada Równości (Equality Parade), a demonstration promoting LGBT rights in Poland coupled with a gay pride parade. 

Senyszyn frequently criticizes the Roman Catholic Church in Poland. On her internet blog, she called it "impudent, spiritless, rich, unpunished and brazen". In response, bishop Tadeusz Pieronek said that she should be pasturing cattle instead.

Personal life
Senyszyn's husband, Bolesław Senyszyn, is a lawyer from Gdynia.

External links
Official page
Joanna Senyszyn at EP page

1949 births
Living people
People from Gdynia
Members of the Polish Sejm 2001–2005
Members of the Polish Sejm 2005–2007
Members of the Polish Sejm 2007–2011
Members of the Polish Sejm 2019–2023
Democratic Left Alliance politicians
Democratic Left Alliance MEPs
MEPs for Poland 2009–2014
Women MEPs for Poland
Women members of the Sejm of the Republic of Poland
University of Gdańsk alumni
Recipients of the Gold Cross of Merit (Poland)
Polish atheists
Critics of the Catholic Church